Kyancutta is a small wheatbelt town at the junction of the Eyre and Tod Highways on the Eyre Peninsula in South Australia. Once a busy town with an airport, Kyancutta is now nearly a ghost town, acting only as a centre for the agricultural districts surrounding it, as well as passing tourists.

History
The town was established in 1917 to support the surrounding agricultural lands. The name is thought to be derived from the Aboriginal kanjakatari; kanja – "stone" and katari – "surface water", implying water in rocks. Another possible origin is that the name was taken from a nearby hill "Kutta kutta" which was the local Aboriginal name for the night hawk.

An airport was built not long after establishment, and flights between Adelaide and Perth stopped there regularly. This added another facet to the town's economy, and caused the town to fall into a steady decline after its closure in 1935.

A school was built in the town in 1920, remaining active for 25 years before closing in 1945.

An official weather station, established at Kyancutta in 1928, became Australia's first fully automated station with a three hourly programme of weather observation which is still ongoing under the care of the Australian Bureau of Meteorology.

In 1986, a memorial park was established to honour the pioneers of agricultural settlement in the area.

Economy
The town now is the service centre for the surrounding agricultural districts, with cereal crops and sheep grazing the prevalent industries. Grain silos for storage of wheat and field peas are located in Kyancutta at the railway station on the Eyre Peninsula Railway to Port Lincoln.

It also serves as a rest point for travellers making their way across the Eyre Highway. Kyancutta has no real attractions of its own, but a number of natural features including Waddikee Rock and Corrobinne Hill do lie within 20 km of the town.

Facilities
Kyancutta has free camping in the park adjacent the Kyancutta Store. The store does Cafe food and Coffee as well as fuel. For the locals, a post office and a sporting complex including 18 hole golf course, tennis, football and netball facilities are also located in the town.

References

External links
Tourism Eyre Peninsula page
Sydney Morning Herald Travel page

Towns in South Australia
Eyre Peninsula